Final league standings for the 1915-16 St. Louis Soccer League.

League standings

References
St. Louis Soccer Leagues (RSSSF)
The Year in American Soccer - 1916

1915-16
1915–16 domestic association football leagues
1915–16 in American soccer
St Louis Soccer
St Louis Soccer